"Here We Go" is a hip hop and R&B song recorded by American rapper Trina. Built around a sample from Force MDs's "Tender Love" (1985), it was produced by Jim Jonsin for her third album Glamorest Life (2005) and features guest vocals by R&B singer Kelly Rowland. The song was released on September 23, 2005 as the album's second single and became Trina's first top 20 hit as a lead artist in the US, staying on the Billboard Hot 100 for 20 weeks. Elsewhere released in April 2006, "Here We Go" also saw success in the UK and New Zealand, reaching number 15 in both countries. In the United States, the song was certified gold by the Recording Industry Association of America (RIAA) in 2006 for selling over 500,000 copies.

Trina included the official remix version of the song on her mixtape Rockstarr: The Baddest Bitch Reloaded, with a new verse from herself as well as a verse from Lil Wayne.

Commercial performance 
The song "Here We Go" by Trina and Kelly Rowland has been listed for 33 weeks in 4 different charts. Its first appearance was week 40/2005 in the US Singles Top 100 and the last appearance was week 22/2006 in the UK Singles Top 75. Its peak position was number 15, on the UK Singles Top 75, it stayed there for 1 week. Its highest entry was number 17 in the Finland Singles Top 20 and New Zealand Top 40.

Music video 
The music video was directed by Nick Quested. American professional basketball player Rasual Butler starred in the music video. Trina is on the phone to her love interest, tells him she has had enough of him and his infidelity and announces that the relationship is over. Kelly supports Trina, shows her photographs of her love interest and another woman spending quality time together in a restaurant and Trina is devastated. With the relationship being over, she decides to move out, empties his house, puts his possessions for sale and she and Kelly get on a cab and smile. Her love interest comes home in a taxi, enters his home, notices all his belongings and possessions are gone, finds an envelope on the floor and picks it up. As he opens it, he pulls out the photographs containing him and his mistress and is shocked to discover Trina found out about the affair. It is shown that the other woman is also the person who drives them away. As her love interest is looking at the photos a muscular man walks into the house and lunges to attack him.

Track listing 

German CD single
"Here We Go" (Explicit Album Version) - 3:50  
"Don't Trip" (Explicit Album Version) - 3:28  
"Tonight" - 4:14  
"Here We Go" (Video Version) - 3:50

Europe CD single
"Here We Go" (Radio Edit) - 3:36  
"Here We Go" (Instrumental) - 3:50

UK CD single
"Here We Go" (Explicit Album Version) - 3:50
"Tonight" - 4:14

US CD single
"Here We Go" (Radio) - 3:50  
"Here We Go" (Radio Edit) - 3:36  
"Here We Go" (Instrumental) - 3:50  
"Here We Go" (Explicit) - 3:50

12" vinyl
Side A
"Here We Go" (Explicit Album Version)
"Here We Go" (Amended Album Version)
Side B
"Here We Go" (Instrumental)   
"Tonight"

Charts

Weekly charts

Year-end charts

Certifications

References 

2005 singles
Kelly Rowland songs
Trina songs
Song recordings produced by Jim Jonsin
Songs written by Jim Jonsin
Songs written by Jimmy Jam and Terry Lewis
Songs written by Trina
Songs written by Teedra Moses
2005 songs
Atlantic Records singles
Songs about infidelity